Mumbles Hill is a hill near the south eastern tip of the Gower Peninsula, Wales.  Parts of the hill form a designated Local Nature Reserve, declared in 1991.

Defensive gunnery positions were built on the hill in World War II. Remnants of the 623rd Anti-Aircraft Battery gun emplacements and control bunker are still visible on the hill.

Coastal Defence Battery 299 had a site on a hill with 6 inch gun and underground magazines, though none of this remains on the hill.  However there are information boards marking the spot.

External links
City and County of Swansea: Mumbles Hill
BBC South West Wales: Mumbles Hill Local Nature Reserve
Swancam: Mumbles Hill
 World War II Coastal Defence Battery 299 on Mumbles Hill - including a link to Anti-Aircraft Battery maps & plans
A History of Mumbles: by Oystermouth Historical Association, 'Mumbles Hill, A Ramble Through Time', from prehistory to the present day

Nature reserves in Swansea
Gower Peninsula
Mountains and hills of Swansea